Sebastian Wolf (born 1 March 1993) is a German footballer who plays as a goalkeeper.

References

External links
 

1993 births
Living people
Footballers from Munich
German footballers
Association football goalkeepers
SpVgg Unterhaching players
3. Liga players
SpVgg Unterhaching II players